NetCologne is a regional telecommunications, cable television and Internet service provider in the Cologne region of Germany. It operates its own copper, coaxial, FTTB and CDMA2000 networks. It serves 518.000 customers and is owned by the city of Cologne. The company has around 900 employees.

References

External links
 

Companies based in Cologne
Internet service providers of Germany
Internet mirror services
Cable television companies
Cable television companies of Germany